Gershon Shefa (born 18 May 1943) is an Israeli former swimmer. He competed at the 1960, 1964 and the 1968 Summer Olympics.

At the 1965 Maccabiah Games, he won a gold medal in the 200 m breaststroke.

References

External links
 

1943 births
Living people
Competitors at the 1965 Maccabiah Games
Israeli male swimmers
Maccabiah Games medalists in swimming
Maccabiah Games gold medalists for Israel
Olympic swimmers of Israel
Swimmers at the 1960 Summer Olympics
Swimmers at the 1964 Summer Olympics
Swimmers at the 1968 Summer Olympics
People from Petah Tikva
Asian Games medalists in swimming
Asian Games silver medalists for Israel
Asian Games bronze medalists for Israel
Swimmers at the 1966 Asian Games
Medalists at the 1966 Asian Games
20th-century Israeli people